Edgar Oehler (born 2 March 1942) is a Swiss businessman and politician. He is a former member of the National Council (Switzerland) and served as a member for the Christian Democratic People's Party from 1971 to 1995.

Early life and education 
Oehler was born into a modest family in Balgach, Switzerland to Ludwig Oehler and Rosa (née Eschenmoser). His father was a commercial painter and the family often struggled to make ends meet. He completed the public schools at Balgach and Widnau before entering the Kantonsschule St. Gallen where he completed his Matura in 1962. In 1961, he took part in a student exchange, earning an American high school diploma at Dallas Senior High School in Dallas, Oregon. He then served his mandatory military service with the Swiss Armed Forces in the function of infantryman. Between 1963 and 1967 he studied at University of St. Gallen Political science with a major in Public law. He completed an exchange semester at the International Christian University in Tokyo, Japan. He earned his PhD in 1975.

Career 
Already during his college studies he ventured into the world of business, operating a plaster company and worked as journalist for various newspapers such as the daily newspaper Die Ostschweiz. He stopped with those activities when he entered Arbonia Forster Group (AFG), in which he was employed from 1985 to 1990 as general director. On 11 September 2003 he took-over the majority of the shares of the group as well as all its subsidiaries. Until 2014 he was majority shareholder and board member of the group.

Politics 
Oehler was a member of the National Council (Switzerland) from 1971 until 1995 for the Christian Democratic People's Party (CVP). He was a member of several commissions focussing on economy, finance and state and foreign policy. From 1991 to 2004 he has been the president of the Association of the Swiss Tobacco Industry and a lobbyist of the tobacco industry.

Private 
Since 1976, he is married to Marianne (née Metzler), and resides in Horgen, Balgach and Miami Beach, Florida. His wife is a painter. He has no biological children but four adopted daughters which were conveyed by the controversial adoption agency of Alice Honegger in Sri Lanka.

Oehler has an estimated net worth of $270–320 million (as of 2020) by Bilanz magazine.

Literature 

 Edgar Oehler: Stammtafeln Öler, Oeler, Öhler und Oehler von Balgach SG

References 

Christian Democratic People's Party of Switzerland politicians
Swiss newspaper journalists
20th-century Swiss businesspeople
People from the canton of St. Gallen
1942 births
Living people